South Komelik (O'odham) name translates as "South Flat", is a census-designated place in Pima County, in the U.S. state of Arizona. The population was 117 as of the 2020 census. It's located in the southern part of the Tohono O'odham Nation reservation near the border with Mexico.

Demographics
At the 2020 census there were 117 people, 39 households, and 27 families living in the CDP. The population density was 30 people per square mile. There were 68 housing units.

The median household income was $23,620. The per capita income for the CDP was $12,561.

References

Census-designated places in Pima County, Arizona
Tohono O'odham Nation
Populated places in the Sonoran Desert